Tigres Fútbol Club is a professional Colombian football team based in Bogotá that plays in the Categoría Primera B. They play their home games at the Metropolitano de Techo stadium.

History
The history of the club began in 1998 when the team played in the Categoría Primera B under the name Univalle, playing the first half in Jamundí and the second in Palmira with Hernan Dario Herrera as coach.

In 1991 the team was renamed Expreso Palmira, due to the support of the carrier of the same name. In that season the coaches were Carlos Burbano and José Martínez, who left the team in tenth place.

In the 2000 season with coach Eduardo Lara, the club played a prominent campaign to reclassification, and placed third, qualifying for the final round for the promotion. There it faced Deportivo Pereira, Unión Magdalena and Deportivo Rionegro, ranking third again.

In 2001 the club was ranked eighth in the table, thus qualifying to the play-offs where they finished last behind Bogotá Chicó, Cúcuta Deportivo and Unión Magdalena.

In 2002, Expreso Palmira was purchased by businessmen who renamed the club Expreso Rojo de Cartagena. The same year the team won the Primera C championship.

In 2003 the club plays its first season in the Primera B, being first to the reclassification but being eliminated in the play-offs. Two years later the club moved to Sincelejo, which only lasted a year, and in 2006 returned to Cartagena. In the 2007 season the team moved to the city of Fusagasugá, Cundinamarca.

His most notable participation in Colombian soccer occurred in 2008 on the Copa Colombia where the club reached the semi-finals. The club was eliminated by Once Caldas, with the aggregate score of 1–0.

In 2009 the team moved to Zipaquirá due to economic problems. For the 2011 season Expreso Rojo decides to move back to the city of Fusagasugá, however due to the poor performances the club moved to Soacha. In 2015, the team moved back to Zipaquirá. For the following season (2016), the club was renamed as Tigres F.C. and earned promotion to the Categoría Primera A for the 2017 season after only one season by winning Group A in the Primera B semifinals. They became runners-up after losing the final to América de Cali on aggregate score. However, they were relegated back to the Primera B after only one season in the top flight.

Stadium

Kit manufacturer

Honours
Categoría Primera B:
Runners-up (1): 2016

Current squad

References

External links
Tigres F.C. on DIMAYOR.com

Football clubs in Colombia
Association football clubs established in 1997
1997 establishments in Colombia
Categoría Primera B clubs